The Jacob Wetterling Crimes Against Children and Sexually Violent Offender Registration Act, colloquially known as the Wetterling Act, is a United States law that requires states to implement a registry of sex offenders and crimes against children.  It is named for Jacob Wetterling, a Minnesota eleven-year-old who was abducted by a stranger in 1989, and was missing for almost 27 years until his death was confirmed when his remains were found on September 1, 2016.

The law, enacted as part of the Federal Violent Crime Control and Law Enforcement Act of 1994, requires states to form registries of offenders convicted of sexually violent offenses or offenses against children, and to form more rigorous registration requirements for sex offenders. States must also verify the addresses of sex offenders annually for at least ten years, and those offenders classified as sexually violent predators must verify their addresses quarterly for the rest of their lives. The Wetterling Act required state compliance by September 1997, with a two-year extension for good faith efforts to achieve compliance; non-compliance would result in a 10% reduction of federal block grant funds for criminal justice.

Under this law, states had discretion to disseminate registration information to the public, but dissemination was not required. Congress amended the Wetterling Act in 1996 with Megan’s Law, requiring law enforcement agencies to release information about registered sex offenders that law enforcement deems relevant to protecting the public. Also passed by Congress in 1996 was the Pam Lychner Sexual Offender Tracking and Identification Act.  This act requires the Federal Bureau of Investigation (FBI) to establish a national database of sex offenders to assist local enforcement agencies in tracking sex offenders across state lines.

The Wetterling Act was amended for the final time in 1998 with Section 115 of the General Provisions of Title I of the Departments of Commerce, Justice and State, the Judiciary, and Related Agencies Appropriations Act (CJSA). The CJSA amendment provided for greater discretion among states for procedures used for contacting registered offenders to keep their addresses updated. Also, the CJSA required offenders to register in a state other than their own if they were there for school, and required federal and military employees to register in their state of residence.

See also 
Sex offender registry
Megan's law
Adam Walsh Child Protection and Safety Act

Sex offender registration
103rd United States Congress
United States federal criminal legislation
Sex offender registries in the United States